The Later Three Kingdoms period (889-935 AD) of ancient Korea saw a partial revival of the old three kingdoms which had dominated the peninsula from the 1st century BC to the 7th century AD. After the Unified Silla kingdom had ruled Korea alone from 668 AD, it slowly began to decline and the power vacuum this created led to several rebellious states rising up and taking on the old historical names of Korea's ancient kingdoms. A messy period of alliances and in-fighting followed, but one state would once again establish a dominant position – Goryeo, itself named in homage to the earlier northern Goguryeo kingdom – and form a unified Korean state and a dynasty which would last for over 500 years.

The Fall of Silla
The Unified Silla Kingdom (668- 935 AD) had held sway over the Korean peninsula for three centuries, but the state was in a slow decline. The rigidity of its class structure based on the Bone rank system meant that few could rise above the position of their birth and ideas and innovation were stifled. The aristocracy began to resent the power and waste of the king, landowners resisted centralised control, and the peasantry grew more and more rebellious over the incessant taxes levied upon them. The state was falling apart from within.

The weakness of the central Silla government meant that local warlords and strongmen, always difficult to bring under state control at the best of times, now ruled their own territories as they pleased. Banditry swept across the peninsula, particularly infamous examples being Chongill, Kihwon, Yanggil, and a group known as the Red Pantaloons (Chokkojok).

Gyeon Hwon and Gung Ye
This period of political turmoil which turned into a free-for-all for control of Korea is referred to as the Later Three Kingdoms period (889-935 AD). Gyeon Hwon (867-936 AD), a peasant leader and Silla army officer, took advantage of the political unrest in 892 AD and made himself military governor of the city of Muju. By 900 AD Gyeon became more ambitious and, joining forces with the bandit Yanggil, formed a revival of the old Baekje (Paekche) kingdom in the south-west portion of the peninsula. He chose Wansan (modern Jeonju) as his capital.

Meanwhile, an aristocratic Buddhist monk leader, Gung Ye, declared a new Goguryeo state in the north in 901 AD, known as Later Goguryeo (Hugoguryo). Gung Ye was either the illegitimate son of Gyeongmun of Silla or Heonan of Silla depending on the account. He, too, had formed an alliance with Yanggil but proved rather more ruthless and killed the bandit, clearing the way to declare himself king in his own right. His capital was first at Songak (Gaesong) and then Cheorwon. He also twice changed the name of his kingdom – to Majin in 904 AD and Taebong in 911 AD – illustrative of his unstable character. One thing that never changed was Gung's hatred of Silla and his insistence that his subjects always refer to it as the 'nation of the damned.'

There then followed a protracted power struggle for control of the peninsula. Gyeon Hwon attacked Gyeongju, the Silla capital, in 927 AD, while Gung Ye's unpopular and fanatical tyranny led to his death at the hands of his people. Gung had become drunk on power and believed himself to be the Maitreya Buddha, spent his time composing sutras, dressed himself and his family in extravagant robes, and never went anywhere without an entourage of 200 monks chanting in his wake. He even claimed he had the power of mind-reading and used his 'skills' to purge his court of anyone he suspected of disloyal intentions. Gung was succeeded in 918 AD by his first minister, the able Wang Geon who probably had a hand in his hated predecessor's assassination. Wang had already distinguished himself as a naval commander, capturing several islands and blocking Baekje's trade with China and Japan. Wang selected the new name of Goryeo (Koryo) and moved the capital to Songak (modern Kaesong) where his father had long been a wealthy merchant and local headman.

Wang Geon's Unification of Korea
Later Baekje (Hubaekche) attacked the Silla kingdom in 920 and 924 AD. Silla, now the weakest of the three kingdoms and only controlling a small heartland in the deep south, responded by calling on Later Goguryeo for assistance. When Baekje attacked and sacked the Silla capital of Gyeongju in 927 AD, the Silla king Gyeongae of Silla (r. 924-927 AD) was forced to commit suicide and a puppet ruler, Kim Pu installed in his place with the reign name of Gyeongsun. Wang responded by attacking the Later Baekje capital, which was now beset by leadership in-fighting. Gyeon Hwon then lost a battle at Geochang to a force led by Wang. Back at the Baekje capital, Gyeon faced a rebellion led by his son Gyeon Singeom, who, displeased that his father had favoured his younger brother as next in line for the throne, imprisoned Gyeon.

Wang was now in possession of most of Silla's territory, which he controlled via a new garrison outside Gyeongju, and his position as de facto ruler of Korea was recognised by the Tang dynasty of China in 932 AD. In 934 AD, after Wang's overwhelming victory over Baekje at Unju (Hongseong), refugees from the northern Manchurian state of Balhae (Parhae) felt the situation stable enough to return to Korea.

Gyeongsun of Silla surrendered and named Wang as his successor in 935 AD, and in the same year Gyeon, who had escaped to Later Goguryeo territory, appealed to his old enemy Wang for help to remove Gyeon Singeom. Gyeon led a Goguryeo army to Baekje, and the resulting civil war and death of both Gyeon Singeom and Gyeon Hwon in 936 AD, greatly weakened Baekje and allowed Wang to finally unify the country once again under the name of Goryeo, origin of today's name for Korea. Wang, posthumously given the title of Taejo of Goryeo or 'Great Founder,' established a dynasty which would rule Korea for the next five centuries.

See also
Silla
Baekje
Taebong
Later Baekje
Later Sabeol
Gyeon Hwon
Gung Ye
Wang Geon
Samguk Yusa
Three Kingdoms of Korea
List of monarchs of Korea
Taejo of Goryeo
Taejo Wang Geon (TV series)
Tomb of King Wanggon
Family tree of the Goryeo kings
Silla monarchs family tree

External links
 https://www.worldhistory.org/Later_Three_Kingdoms_Period by Mark Cartwright

 
9th-century conflicts
10th-century conflicts
History of Korea
10th century in Korea
Wars of succession involving the states and peoples of Asia